Samuel Henry (9 May 1878 – 23 May 1952) was an Irish customs officer, pension officer, antiquarian, lecturer, writer, photographer, folklorist, folk-song collector and musician.

He is best known for his collection of ballads and songs in Songs of the People, the largest and most comprehensive collection of just under 690 folk-songs from Northern Ireland assembled  between the wars (1923–1939), when he was song editor for the Northern Constitution, a weekly newspaper in Coleraine.

Early life
Henry was born and educated in Sandleford, Coleraine, Ireland. He came from a prominent Coleraine family and was the youngest of five sons: his brother William was town clerk of Coleraine; Robert, principal of the Model School; James, vice principal of The Honourable The Irish Society's Primary School; and Tom, a civil servant. In 1897, when he was 19, Sam passed two examinations, one as teacher and the other as an exciseman, choosing to follow the latter career.

Description
According to his daughter, Mrs Olive Mary Henry Craig, Henry was a "very large man, tall, broad and burly" who weighed over sixteen stone (225 pounds, over 100 kilograms). He rode a bicycle and also used a car in his travels around the northern counties, as well as the public transport system (bus and train). Henry described himself as "an ardent amateur naturalist, archaeologist, antiquarian, genealogist, and photographer." He was a Fellow of the Royal Society of Antiquaries of Ireland and could therefore append the letters FRSAI after his name. He was also an amateur ornithologist regarded as an authority on the birds of the north of Ireland. As a well-known lecturer who communicated his enthusiasm and knowledge of his special hobbies to other people, Henry contributed many articles on such matters to the local papers.

Career
After service as a customs & excise officer in England (1903-4), Henry returned home, where he served mainly around Coleraine. When Lloyd George instituted the Old-Age Pensions Act 1908, Henry was appointed to administer it in his area, while still carrying out his duties for the Inland Revenue.

Henry began to assemble his collection of folk songs while he was still a civil servant and continued it after his retirement. When he was appointed Pension Officer, Henry's duties included visiting the poor and elderly people in some of the most isolated areas of Northern Ireland, to determine if they were eligible for old age pensions or relief. To overcome the natural reticence of country people in those remote areas, Henry often took his fiddle and tin whistle with him, played a tune and then asked if anyone in the household knew any of the old songs. He would then record these songs by writing them down using a basic music notation system called tonic sol-fa.

Songs of the People
When he became song editor for the Northern Constitution in 1923, Henry used his column to specify what type of old songs he wanted. In return, the readers contributed songs that he published in a weekly series he called Songs of the People: "Let it be our joyful task to search out, conserve, and make known the treasures of the Songs of the People". In order to motivate the readers, Henry ran weekly song competitions, offering "a weekly prize of a free copy of the Northern Constitution for six months for the best old song submitted."

The first song in the series, "The Flower of Sweet Dunmull" (Henry number H1) was printed on 17 November 1923, and the last one, "The Lass of Mohee" (H836), on 9 December 1939. A long period of illness caused Henry to suspend his editorship after "Ann O'Drumcroon" (H246) was printed on 28 July 1928, and he resumed his duties on 22 October 1932 with the printing of "The Braes of Sweet Kilhoyle" (H464). During his long absence, the Songs of the People series was looked after by other editors who published just over 200 articles altogether (numbered 247-463), which therefore do not appear in Henry's scrapbooks. When the series ended on 9 December 1939, Henry had contributed just under 690 songs of high quality, many with multiple variants. Although the songs were collected in a single district around Coleraine, there is a great amount of diversity, including not only native Irish songs but also songs from Scotland, England and North America.

When publication of the Northern Constitution weekly column ended with the advent of World War II, Henry continued to collect and annotate songs and tried to have his collection published in book form. To this end, he assembled two scrapbooks containing most of the material, edited and augmented by his notes of variations, plus other details and corrections of misprints. This material was in the form of cuttings, proof or typescript copies. He also assembled three separate sets of Songs of the People: the Belfast Central Library set, consisting mainly of offprints and cuttings from the Northern Constitution; the National Library of Ireland (Dublin) set, and the Library of Congress (Washington, DC) set, the latter two consisting of three scrapbooks each. All these sets were assembled in varying degrees of completeness. The Belfast set was subsequently copied by the BBC and one of the copies presented to the English Folk Dance and Song Society where it is kept in the Vaughan Williams Memorial Library at Cecil Sharp House. The BBC also commissioned Sean O'Boyle to create an index intended for internal use. Independently of Henry's efforts, another set had been compiled by A. Albert Campbell, a Belfast solicitor and bibliophile who had corresponded with Henry. Campbell bequeathed his set of eight scrapbooks to the  Belfast Linen Hall Library and, although also incomplete at the time, this set was later augmented and any gaps filled with photocopies of the BBC set of Henry's own scrapbooks.

Legacy
Despite Henry's attempts to have his collection of folk songs published in book form, this would not happen until 1990, 38 years after his death, when Sam Henry's Songs of the People was published by the University of Georgia Press. This book includes all the songs Henry had published in the Northern Constitution from 17 November 1923 to 28 July 1928 (H1 to H246), and from 28 October 1932 to 9 December 1939 (H464 to H836), with all the songs' tunes transcribed from tonic sol-fa to standard staff notation, plus extensive appendices, indexes and reference aids developed by the book's editors: Gale Huntington, Lani Herrmann and John Moulden.

Henry's collection was the subject of extensive scholarship by Moulden, yielding several publications and a conference address to the Library of Congress on 2 May 2007. The collection inspired recordings by folk singers such as
Margaret Barry,
Paul Brady, 
Eddie Butcher,
Cara Dillon,
Joe Heaney, 
Joe Holmes & Len Graham,
Dolores Keane,
Paddy Tunney,
and many others. Andy Irvine, who first consulted the Dublin set in the mid-1960s, has interpreted an extensive selection of its songs since the early 1970s as a solo artist and with Planxty, Paul Brady, Patrick Street, and Mozaik. 

In addition to his collection of songs, Henry left behind a large aggregate of 11,000 items, comprising photographs and documents, donated to the Coleraine Museum by his grandson, Gordon Craig, on 25 August 2011.

A documentary in two episodes on Songs of the People was aired by the BBC, during April 2019.

Publications

Books by Sam Henry
 A Hank of Yarns (No date)
 Tales of the Antrim seaboard: Dunluce, Giant's Causeway, Fair Head (1930) 
 Rowlock rhymes and Songs of exile (1933)
 Ulster folk tales: poetry, lore and tradition of the North-East (1939)
 Songs of the people: collected from traditional sources (3 vol. musical score) (1941?)
 The Story of St Patrick’s Church, Coleraine (1941?)
 Dunluce and the Giant’s Causeway (1945)

Books about Songs of the People

Selected discography
The following table shows a selection of songs recorded from Henry's collection.

 Title – the title of the song (this column is sortable)
 No. – the song's Henry number (Hxxx) (this column is sortable) 
 Singer – the name of the singer on the recording (this column is sortable) 
 Album – the title of the album featuring the recorded song (this column is sortable)
 Year – the year the album was released (this column is sortable)
 Notes – a reference about the song and/or its recording (this column is not sortable).

Notes

References

External links
 

 

1878 births
1952 deaths
Civil servants from Northern Ireland
Irish antiquarians
Irish civil servants
Irish fiddlers
Irish folklorists
Irish folk-song collectors
Irish journalists
Irish photographers
Irish tin whistle players
Irish writers
Musicians from County Londonderry
People from Coleraine, County Londonderry